Antipolis, Greek for 'city opposite' (another), is the name or part of the name of:
modern Antibes
Sophia-Antipolis

It is also the name of a tanker ship owned by Andriaki Shipping.